Edward Loyden is a footballer who played as a centre forward in the Football League for Blackpool, Chester, Shrewsbury Town, Barnsley and Tranmere Rovers. As a Tranmere player, he is remembered for scoring the goal that defeated Arsenal at Highbury in October 1973.

References

1945 births
Living people
Footballers from Liverpool
English footballers
Association football forwards
Blackpool F.C. players
Carlisle United F.C. players
Chester City F.C. players
Shrewsbury Town F.C. players
Barnsley F.C. players
Tranmere Rovers F.C. players
Highlands Park F.C. players
English Football League players
English expatriate footballers
Expatriate soccer players in South Africa
Expatriate footballers in Hong Kong